The 1929 European Figure Skating Championships were held in Davos, Switzerland. Elite senior-level figure skaters from European ISU member nations competed for the title of European Champion in the discipline of men's singles.

Results

Men

References

External links
 results

European Figure Skating Championships, 1929
European Figure Skating Championships, 1929
European Figure Skating Championships
European 1929
Sport in Davos